IFK Luleå is a Swedish football club formed in 1900, located in Luleå. The club merged with Luleå FF and played under the name Luleå FF/IFK from 1986 to 1989.

History

IFK Luleå was originally founded in the year 1900, but went dormant after some years. In 1920, the sports club IK Gyltzau won the Norrbotten district championship in bandy and this club was then renamed as a revived IFK Luleå, which continued to play bandy for many years. In 1932 and 1934 the bandy district championship was won again, now under the IFK name.

IFK Luleå played one season in the Allsvenskan in 1971, the top-tier of Swedish football, but after a promising start their stay was short-lived as they were relegated at the end of the season.  In the late 1980s and most of the 1990s the club enjoyed their heyday by playing in Division 1 Norra, which at that time was the second tier of Swedish football. Over the last decade IFK Luleå have been competing in the Division 2 Norrland which is now the fourth tier of the Swedish football league system. For 4 consecutive seasons between 2006 and 2009 they have experienced the frustration of finishing in second position and consequently missing out on promotion.

In 2010 under new coach Fredrik Waara did they finally finish in first place and receive promotion to Division 1 Norra where they finished in tenth place during the next two seasons.

The club is affiliated to the Norrbottens Fotbollförbund.

Season to season

Current squad

Attendances

In recent seasons IFK Luleå have had the following average attendances:

Achievements

League
 Division 1 Norra:
 Runners-up (2): 1991, 1992

References

External links

 IFK Luleå – official site

Football clubs in Norrbotten County
Allsvenskan clubs
Sport in Luleå
Association football clubs established in 1900
Bandy clubs established in 1900
1900 establishments in Sweden
Idrottsföreningen Kamraterna